Cambalache (Southern Cone Spanish for bazaar or "junkshop") is an Argentine slang-language tango song written in 1934 by Enrique Santos Discépolo for the movie The Soul of the Accordion, released the following year. It is explicitly critical of 20th-century corruption and, having been written during the Infamous Decade, was banned by a succession of dictatorial governments before censorship was relaxed under General Juan Peron.

The first ten notes of the song are heard when Emperor Austin denies Tasha's tea set in High Tea, the 20th episode of the Nick Jr. show The Backyardigans.

References

External links
 Lyrics in Todotango.
 Lubliner, J. Cambalache (Junk Shop) Alternative translation
 .

Tangos
Spanish-language songs
1934 songs